Wilbur is an unincorporated community in Tyler County, West Virginia, United States. Wilbur had a post office, which closed on February 1, 1988.

References

Unincorporated communities in Tyler County, West Virginia
Unincorporated communities in West Virginia